Jahmir Young (born October 7, 2000) is an American college basketball player for the Maryland Terrapins of the Big Ten Conference. He previously played for the Charlotte 49ers.

High school career
Young played basketball for St. Mary's Ryken High School in Leonardtown, Maryland in his first two years. For his junior season, he transferred to DeMatha Catholic High School in Hyattsville, Maryland due to a coaching change at St. Mary's Ryken. At DeMatha Catholic, he played alongside teammates: Hunter Dickinson, Justin Moore, Earl Timberlake, and Tyrell Ward. As a junior, Young averaged 11.7 points per game and helped his team win the Washington Catholic Athletic Conference title. On the Amateur Athletic Union circuit, he played for Team Takeover and won a Peach Jam title. As a senior, Young earned All-Conference honors and was ranked a top 10 senior in Maryland. A three-star recruit, he committed to playing college basketball for Charlotte over offers from Boston College, Hofstra, Old Dominion and La Salle.

College career
As a freshman at Charlotte, Young averaged 12.5 points, 5.2 rebounds and 2.8 assists per game, and was named Third Team All-Conference USA (C-USA) and Freshman of the Year. He was an eight-time C-USA Freshman of the Week honoree, becoming the fourth player in league history to do so. On December 19, 2020, Young scored a sophomore season-high 27 points in a 76–72 win against North Carolina A&T. As a sophomore, he averaged 18 points, 4.9 rebounds and 2.5 assists per game, earning First Team All-C-USA honors. On January 17, 2022, Young scored a career-high 30 points in a 96–67 loss against Florida Atlantic. He repeated on the First Team All-C-USA as a junior. As a junior, Young averaged 19.6 points, 5.9 rebounds and 3.7 assists per game. On March 29, 2022, he declared for the 2022 NBA draft while maintaining his college eligibility and later entered the transfer portal on April 7.

On April 27, 2022, Young transferred to Maryland. Young, keeping his professional options open, also announced that he will continue with the NBA Draft process while maintaining his eligibility. In his first year with the program, Young, starring at point guard, led the renewal of the Maryland program under first-year head coach Kevin Willard. In 2023, Young was named Second Team All-Big Ten by both coaches and media.

Career statistics

College

|-
| style="text-align:left;"| 2019–20
| style="text-align:left;"| Charlotte
| 29 || 29 || 32.3 || .426 || .373 || .738 || 5.2 || 2.8 || 1.6 || .3 || 12.5
|-
| style="text-align:left;"| 2020–21
| style="text-align:left;"| Charlotte
| 25 || 25 || 37.5 || .423 || .338 || .834 || 4.9 || 2.5 || 1.0 || .3 || 18.0
|-
| style="text-align:left;"| 2021–22
| style="text-align:left;"| Charlotte
| 31 || 31 || 35.8 || .468 || .341 || .892 || 5.9 || 3.7 || 1.1 || .5 || 19.6
|-
| style="text-align:left;"| 2022–23
| style="text-align:left;"| Maryland
| 29 || 29 || 30.8 || .433 || .316 || .827 || 4.7 || 3.3 || 1.2 || .4 || 16.2
|- class="sortbottom"
| style="text-align:center;" colspan="2"| Career
| 114 || 114 || 34 || .440 || .343 || .829 || 5.2 || 3.1 || 1.2 || .4 || 16.6

References

External links
Charlotte 49ers bio

2000 births
Living people
American men's basketball players
Basketball players from Maryland
People from Upper Marlboro, Maryland
DeMatha Catholic High School alumni
Charlotte 49ers men's basketball players
Maryland Terrapins men's basketball players
Point guards